Mario Ramírez may refer to:

 Mario Ramírez (baseball) (1957-2013), Puerto Rican baseball player
 Mario Ramírez Treviño (born 1962), Mexican suspected drug lord
 Mario Ramírez (footballer) (born 1965), Paraguayan footballer
 Mario Ramírez Reyes (fl. 1990s), Mexican actor

See also
 Marie Ramírez, Costa Rican ten-pin bowler
 María Elena Ramírez (born 1951), Mexican gymnast